ASC Entente Sebkha FC is a Mauritanean football club based in Sebkha a suburb of Nouakchott. The club plays in the Mauritanian second division.

In 2003 the team has won Coupe du Président de la République.

Stadium
Currently the team plays at the 1000 capacity  Stade Cheikha Ould Boïdiya.

Achievements
Coupe du Président de la République
Winner (2): 2003, 2005

References

External links
Soccerway

Football clubs in Mauritania